Bhandara Assembly constituency is one of the 288 Vidhan Sabha (legislative assembly) constituencies in Maharashtra state in central India. This constituency is one of the three constituencies located in Bhandara district.

Overview
Bhandara is part of the Bhandara-Gondiya Lok Sabha constituency along with five other Vidhan Sabha segments, namely Sakoli and Tumsar in the Bhandara district and Gondiya, Arjuni Morgaon and Tirora in the Gondia district.

Geographical Boundaries
The current constituency comprises Whole Bhandara and Pauni Tehsils including Bhandara and Pauni municipalities.

Members of Legislative assembly

Election Results

Assembly Elections 2019

See also
 Bhandara
 List of constituencies of Maharashtra Vidhan Sabha

References

Assembly constituencies of Maharashtra
Bhandara district
Bhandara